José Guadalupe Velázquez Alarcón (August 12, 1923 – 2012) was a Mexican footballer who competed primarily in the México Primera División. He spent most of his career with Puebla F.C., for whom he scored 61 goals, and was a member of the 1944 Copa México championship team. Velázquez represented his national team on one occasion in the 1950 FIFA World Cup held in Brazil.

Personal life
Velázquez was born in Jalisco, Mexico.

Career 
Velázquez made his professional debut with Puebla F.C. in 1944, the club's first year in existence, and played in the Primera División league championship match against Real Club España later that year. Velázquez was his club's top scorer with 13 goals. Puebla F.C. finished the championship series as runner-up. Velázquez then became a key player in the club's victory at that year's Copa México cup against Club América.

In 1951, at the completion of his contract with Puebla F.C., Velázquez moved to Deportivo Veracruz, where he played for a year before retiring.

National team
Together with Puebla F.C. team-mate, Samuel Canno, Velázquez was required to play in the 1950 FIFA World Cup in Brazil. He was selected as captain and played in all three of the scheduled matches, but failed to score.

Honors
Copa México: (1) 1945

External links
 Puebla F.C. Statistics: Kader 1949/1950

References

1923 births
2012 deaths
Mexican footballers
Mexico international footballers
1950 FIFA World Cup players
Liga MX players
Club Puebla players
C.D. Veracruz footballers
Association football forwards